Stephen Smith (20 February 1899 – 27 December 1994) was a Scottish association football goalkeeper who began his career in the United States and ended it with Aberdeen.

In 1921, Smith joined Thistle, a team in the Association Football League, an ethnically British league in Chicago. A year later, he was with the All Scots in the same league. At the time, Chicago teams would tour during the off-season and Smith came to the attention of the Brooklyn Wanderers of the American Soccer League. They signed him for the 1923–24 season, but he saw time in only nine games. He became the regular starter the next season, a position he held for much of the next five years. Over the course of his career with the Wanderers, he played 246 league, 11 National Challenge Cup and 12 League Cup games. In 1930, Smith returned to his native Scotland and joined Aberdeen F.C. where he finished his career in 1938.

Career statistics

Club

Appearances and goals by club, season and competition

References

External links
 

Aberdeen F.C. players
American Soccer League (1921–1933) players
Brooklyn Wanderers players
Scottish footballers
Scottish expatriate footballers
Footballers from Aberdeen
1899 births
1994 deaths
Association football goalkeepers
Scottish expatriate sportspeople in the United States
Scottish emigrants to the United States
Expatriate soccer players in the United States
Scottish Football League players